Battery No. 1 is a historic artillery battery located at James Island, Charleston, South Carolina. It was built in 1863, as part of the James Island Siege Line. At the close of the war it was armed with five pieces of artillery. The earthen redoubt's right face is about 240 feet, the center face approximately 160 feet, and the left face 280 feet in length. It has a 15-foot-high parapet wall and a 20-foot-high powder magazine.

It was listed on the National Register of Historic Places in 1982.

References

Military facilities on the National Register of Historic Places in South Carolina
Military installations established in 1863
Buildings and structures in Charleston County, South Carolina
National Register of Historic Places in Charleston, South Carolina
American Civil War on the National Register of Historic Places